Derussification in Ukraine is a process of removing Russian influence from the country of Ukraine. Derussification began after the collapse of the USSR and intensified with the demolition of monuments to Lenin during Euromaidan and the further systemic process of decommunization in Ukraine. The Russo-Ukrainian War gave a strong impetus to the process. The process manifests itself in the renaming of toponyms named after Russian statesmen and cultural figures, or those that are believed to reflect Russianism and the Russian worldview, or are otherwise associated with Russia. Also part of the process is the dismantling of objects of the Russian rule (plaques, signs, monuments, busts, panels, etc.). As of April 8, 2022, according to a poll by the sociological group Rating, 76% of Ukrainians support the initiative to rename streets and other objects whose names are associated with Russia.

History 
The process began with the collapse of the Soviet Union, but since the issue of decommunization was a much bigger problem, derussification received relatively little attention. The two processes were closely intertwined and initially they took place mostly in a spontaneous and unsystematic way. As the decommunization process in Ukraine had almost been completed by 2022, the derussification process intensified after the Russian invasion of Ukraine. In villages and towns, street names were changed and Soviet-Russian monuments were demolished. Not only architectural structures, but also street names related to Russia were de-Russified. Changes were made in Lviv, Dnipro, Kyiv and Kharkiv. Ivano-Frankivsk became the first city in Ukraine to be completely free of Russian place names.

In June 2022, the city of Kyiv held an electronic consultation to select Ukrainian names with which to rename streets and squares bearing Russian names. 6,5 million Ukrainians took part in the consultation.

Minister of Culture and Information Policy Oleksandr Tkachenko stated that the derussification of Ukraine will take place naturally and that "it's time to say goodbye to the symbols of the Russian-imperial, Soviet ideology forever." He also noted that the Government of Ukraine approved the project of the document "On Amendments to the Law of Ukraine "On Protection of Cultural Heritage": there will be legal grounds for the removal of cultural heritage monuments from the State Register of Immovable Monuments of Ukraine, which is a symbol of the Russian imperial and Soviet totalitarian politics and ideology.

Timeline

2016 
 On February 4, 2016, the Verkhovna Rada launched an active decommunization and de-Russification policy by adopting the Resolution "On renaming certain settlements and districts", which renamed a number of settlements named after Russian statesmen.
 On October 17, 2016, the Minister of Infrastructure of Ukraine Volodymyr Omelyan instructed his staff to rid Boryspil International Airport and other airports in Ukraine of Russian language and communist names. According to Omelyan, all information on electronic billboards and signs or announced by loudspeakers must be in Ukrainian and English only. "This is not only a question of using the state language - it is a question of self-respect", the Minister said.
 On October 25, 2016, the Lviv Regional Council decided to evict the Russian Cultural Center from the communal premises and rent the premises to groups involved in the Ukrainian army's operations in eastern Ukraine against pro-Russian separatists. On October 13, 2018, the "Warrior's House" - a centre for participants and veterans of the Russian-Ukrainian war - was opened in the building of the former Russian Cultural Centre.
 On December 14, 2016, the Standing Committee of the Kyiv City Council on Culture, Tourism and Information Policy approved the draft decision "On renaming avenues, boulevards, streets, alleys, clarifying the names and returning the historical name in the city of Kyiv", which proposes to modify the names of two streets and an alley. The changes concern only the spelling of proper names.

2017 
 On May 23, 2017, the "Rules for placement of advertising media in the city of Kyiv" adopted by the Kyiv City Council came into force. From now on, all advertising in the capital must be in Ukrainian.
 On July 1, 2017, the Chernivtsi City Council renamed the Moscow Olympics street to the Sich Riflemen street.
 On October 5, 2017, the Kyiv City Council adopted a decision "On measures to ensure a regional language policy in the city of Kyiv" and established that in the city of Kyiv Ukrainian is the language of work, record keeping and documentation of all local self-government bodies, enterprises, institutions and organizations of communal ownership, and the language of official announcements and messages.
 On November 2, 2017, the Zhytomyr Regional Council adopted a decision on the de-Russification of the service sector in the region. In the decision "On overcoming the consequences of Soviet occupation in the language environment of Zhytomyr region", it is recommended to use Ukrainian as the language of work, record keeping and documentation of local self-government bodies, enterprises, institutions and organizations of communal ownership. In addition, advertisements, signs, posters, posters, notices and other forms of audio, photo, video advertising products and price tags must be in the Ukrainian language.
 On December 12, 2017, the Cherkasy City Council adopted a decision "On measures to ensure the regional language policy in the city of Cherkasy", according to which Ukrainian is the main language in all spheres of life in the city. The menu of restaurants, advertising, signs and posters must be in Ukrainian.
 On December 14, 2017, the Kyiv Regional Council supported the renaming of Pereyaslav-Khmelnytskyi to Pereyaslav.

2018 
 On February 15, 2018, the session of the Kropyvnytskyi City Council adopted the draft decision "On measures to ensure the regional language policy". The decision states that on the territory of the city, all names of institutions, enterprises, organisations, signs, posters, public notices, advertisements must be exclusively in the Ukrainian language. In addition, all catering establishments must have a menu in the national language, which they are obliged to offer to visitors in the first place. Staff must communicate with customers primarily in Ukrainian and switch to another language only at the request of consumers.
 On February 16, 2018, the Lviv City Council approved the resolution "On regulation of the language of service to citizens in the sphere of service provision, trade and provision of information about goods and services in the city of Lviv". The resolution recommends catering and service establishments to provide services in Ukrainian as well as English. The document also establishes that all signs, posters, posters, notices and price tags in Lviv shall be in the state language.
 On February 22, 2018, the Kyiv City Council decided to de-Russify the names of nine streets and alleys in Kyiv.
 On February 28, 2018, the Constitutional Court of Ukraine issued a decision regarding the unconstitutionality of the 2012 Kolesnichenko-Kivalov Law, effectively canceling it. The law had acknowledged Russian and other minority languages as regional languages of Ukraine, thus allowing their use in courts, schools and other government institutions in areas of Ukraine where the national minorities exceeded 10% of the population.
 On April 12, 2018, the Mykolaiv Regional Council rejected a motion on revoking the status of the Russian language as a regional language, granted in accordance with the repealed Kolesnichenko-Kivalov Law, which had recently been annulled by the Constitutional Court.
 On April 25, 2018, the Odesa City Council, by a majoirity of 50 of its 53 members, decided not to amend its regulationd on the implementation of the Kivalov-Kolesnichenko Language Law, despite the fact that this law had recently been annulled by the Constitutional Court. 
 On May 31, 2018, the President of Ukraine, Petro Poroshenko signed the Decree "On urgent measures to strengthen the state status of the Ukrainian language and promote the creation of a unified cultural space of Ukraine." The decree aimed at ensuring compliance with constitutional guarantees regarding the comprehensive development and functioning of the Ukrainian language as the state language in all spheres of public life throughout the territory of Ukraine, strengthening its consolidating role in Ukrainian society as a means of strengthening state unity, taking into account the need to protect the national linguistic and cultural and linguistic information space, supporting the development of national culture, encouraging the processes of its integration into the European and world cultural space.
 On October 4, 2018, 261 deputies of the Verkhovna Rada voted for the draft law On supporting the functioning of the Ukrainian language as the State language (No. 5670-d) in the first reading. Preparation of the draft law for the second reading lasted about four months. During this time, the Verkhovna Rada Committee on Culture and Spirituality worked out more than two thousand amendments that came from people's deputies. 
 On December 6, 2018, the Kyiv City Council renamed Novorossiysk Square to Chernihivska, and Tolstoy Street to Volodymyr Bets Street. On the same day, deputies of the Kharkiv Regional Council voted to cancel the decision to grant regional status to the Russian language.

2019 

 On April 25, 2019, the Verkhovna Rada adopted the law On supporting the functioning of the Ukrainian language as the State language in the second reading.
 On May 6, 2019, the Dnipropetrovsk District Administrative Court canceled the decision to grant the Russian language in the city of Dnipro the status of a regional language.
 On May 14, 2019, the Verkhovna Rada of Ukraine rejected draft resolutions that blocked the signing of the previously adopted law on the functioning of the Ukrainian language as the state language. Chairman of the Verkhovna Rada Andriy Parubiy signed the law on the functioning of the Ukrainian language as the state language.
 On May 15, 2019, President Petro Poroshenko signed the Law On supporting the functioning of the Ukrainian language as the State language and the following day the law was published by Voice of Ukraine. The law enters into force in 2 months from the date of publication.
 On June 7, 2019, the Donetsk District Administrative Court canceled the decision to grant the Russian language in the Donetsk region the status of a regional language. The applicant is a well-known fighter for the rights of Ukrainians in Ukraine, associate professor of the programming department of Ivan Franko National University of Lviv, Svyatoslav Lytynskyi.
 Various village councils of the Luhansk region canceled the decision to grant the Russian language the status of a regional language: on September 26, 2019, the Golubivsk village council; on October 1, 2019, the Novovodyansk village; on October 3, 2019, the Epiphany village council; on November 4, 2019, the Makeiv village council; on November 7, 2019, the Novomykilsk village council; on November 21, 2019, the Mykhailo village council.
 On October 30, 2019, the Verkhovna Rada returned the historical name of Pereyaslav to the city of Pereyaslav-Khmelnytsky. This was done under request of the city council.

2020 

 On October 9, 2020, the Cabinet of Ministers of Ukraine adopted the Resolution "On Renaming Certain Territories and Objects of the Nature Reserve Fund".
 On October 23, 2020, the Zaporizhia District Administrative Court canceled the decision to grant the Russian language in the city of Zaporizhia the status of a regional language.
 On December 4, 2020, the Odesa District Administrative Court canceled the decision to grant the Russian language in the Odesa region the status of a regional language.

2022 

 On April 13, 2022, 37 streets connected with Russia were renamed in the Ivano-Frankivsk Municipality.
 On April 26, 2022, the bronze sculpture of the Soviet-era People's Friendship Arch of a group of Ukrainians and Russians was dismantled in Kyiv. Interestingly, the head of the sculpture, which symbolized a Russian, fell off.
 In Chernihiv a Zoya Kosmodemyanskaya monument was destroyed on 21 April 2022 and 9 days later a Pushkin monument.
 During a meeting on June 16, a working group of the Ministry of Education and Science of Ukraine decided, in connection with the invasion of Russian Federation into Ukraine, to remove more than 40 works by Soviet and Russian authors from school textbooks.
 Monument to the founders of Odesa, also known as monument to Empress Catherine II of Russian Empire and her companions: José de Ribas, François Sainte de Wollant, Platon Zubov and Grigory Potemkin was removed on December 28, 2022.

See also 
 Demolition of monuments to Alexander Pushkin in Ukraine
 Derussianization
 Decommunization in Ukraine
 Lustration in Ukraine
 People's Friendship Arch — colloquial name "Yarmo" (Yoke)
 Ukrainization
 Law of Ukraine "On supporting the functioning of the Ukrainian language as the State language"

References

External links 

 
 
 
 
 
 
 
 
 
 
 
 
 
 
 
 

Ukraine
Events affected by the 2022 Russian invasion of Ukraine